HMPGNS Rochus Lokinap is a  of the Papua New Guinea Defence Force. Rochus Lokinap was delivered to Papua New Guinea in March 2021 and commissioned in October.

References

External links

2021 ships
Patrol vessels of the Papua New Guinea Defence Force
Guardian class patrol vessels
Ships built by Austal